Carissa tetramera, the sand num-num, is a plant in the dogbane family Apocynaceae. The specific epithet tetramera means "four parts", referring to the flower.

Description
Its strong-scented flowers feature a white corolla, often tinged pink. The fruit is red to purple-black when ripe.

Distribution and habitat
Carissa tetramera is native to Kenya, Tanzania, Zimbabwe, Mozambique, Eswatini and South Africa (KwaZulu-Natal and Northern Provinces). Its habitat is dry open woodland.

References

tetramera
Flora of Kenya
Flora of Tanzania
Flora of Zimbabwe
Flora of Mozambique
Flora of Swaziland
Flora of KwaZulu-Natal
Flora of the Northern Provinces
Plants described in 1893